Miru is a goddess in the Polynesian mythology of the Cook Islands who lives in Avaiki beneath Mangaia.  She feeds the souls of dead people a bowl of live centipedes, causing them to writhe in agony, then  encourages them to seek relief by diving into a lake, where they drown and can be cooked and eaten at her leisure. The Tapairu are her daughters, and Tau-Titi is her son.

Miru also features in Maori mythology (New Zealand) as the Goddess of Death.

References 

Death goddesses
Mangaia mythology
Māori goddesses